Capcom Digital Collection is a compilation of Xbox Live Arcade games released by Capcom for the Xbox 360. The game was released on March 27, 2012 in North America and March 30, 2012 in Europe.

The collection features eight games previously available via Xbox Live Arcade for Xbox 360.

External links 
 Capcom Unity

See also
 Namco Museum Virtual Arcade
 Konami Classics
 PopCap Arcade
 Xbox Live Arcade Unplugged

References 

2012 video games
Capcom video game compilations
Xbox 360 games
Xbox 360-only games
Multiplayer and single-player video games
Video games developed in Japan